The China Open is an annual badminton tournament held in People's Republic of China. It became part of the BWF Super Series tournaments in 2007. BWF categorised China Open as one of the three BWF World Tour Super 1000 events in the BWF events structure since 2018.

Past winners

Multiple winners
Below is the list of the most successful players in the China Open:

Performances by nation

References

 
Badminton tournaments in China
BWF World Tour
1986 establishments in China
Recurring sporting events established in 1986